The 2013/14 South African Rugby League National Club Championship competition is contested between 7 September to ±30 November 2013. SARL NCC is the collective name of two rugby league competitions played between several club sides in South Africa, with the Rhino Cup being the premier competition.

Participating teams

Rhino Cup Club Challenge

Competition Rules
There are five participating clubs in the 2013 Rhino Cup. 
Teams received three points for a win and two points for a draw. One Bonus point is awarded to teams that score within twelve or less points in a game. Teams were ranked by log points, then points difference (points scored less points conceded).

The top two teams qualify for the title play-off.

Standings

Fixtures and results
The 2013 Rhino fixtures and results are as follows:
 All times are South African UTC+2.

Regular season

Round 1

Round 2

Round 3

Round 4

Protea Cup Club Challenge

Competition Rules
There were eight participating clubs in the 2013 Protea Cup.
Teams receive three points for a win and two points for a draw. Bonus points were awarded to teams that lost within twelve or less points in a game. Teams are ranked by log points, then points difference (points scored less points conceded).

The top four teams qualify for play-offs, the two winners then go on to the title Club Grand Final. The team that finished first has home advantage against the team that finished second.

Standings

Fixtures and results
The 2013 Protea Cup fixtures and results are as follows:
 All times are South African UTC+2.

Regular season

Round 1

Round 2

Round 3

Round 4

Rhino Club Challenge Grand Finals

Rhino Cup Grand Final

Protea Cup Grand Final

See also

 South Africa national rugby league team
 Rugby league in South Africa

References

External links
 Fixtures 

South Africa
South Africa
South Africa Rugby League
Rug
Rug